The Columbus Lady Shooting Stars were a W-League club based in Columbus, Ohio, USA, associated with former the Men's USL team, the Columbus Shooting Stars. The team played in the Midwest Division of the Central Conference, and folded after the 2004 season.

Year-by-year

References

Women's soccer clubs in the United States
S
Soccer clubs in Ohio
Defunct USL W-League (1995–2015) teams
2004 disestablishments in Ohio
Sports teams in Columbus, Ohio
Women's sports in Ohio